Antonio Garzya (born 22 January 1927 in Brindisi, died 6 March 2012 in Telese Terme) was an Italian emeritus professor of Greek literature at the University of Naples Federico II, classical scholar, philologist, and specialist in ancient Greek and Byzantine studies.

Biography 
After attending the P. Colonna Gymnasium in Galatina (province of  Lecce) and the G. Palmieri  Lyceum in Lecce, Garzya studied Classical Philology at the University of Naples. He took his degree with a thesis on Andromache by Euripides.  In 1953 he started his teaching career, which he pursued from 1954 until 1966 in state secondary schools.  In 1960 he became an instructor of Byzantine Philology and Papyrology at the University of Naples. From 1965 until 1966 he was a school principal and then interrupted that activity from 1966 to 1968 to be Professor of Byzantine Studies at the University of Macerata, where, at the same time, he taught Latin literature. From 1969 to 1980 he was a professor of Byzantine Philology at the University of Naples. At the same time, from 1973 to 1983, he taught Philology of Medieval and Modern Greek and in 1976 was a guest professor of Byzantine Studies at the University of Vienna. He was a professor of Greek literature beginning in 1981 at the University of Naples and from 1984 to 1988 was Associate Professor of Medieval Greek at the Sorbonne in Paris. In 1993 he became a member of  UPRESA 8062 “Médecine grecque” (formerly URA 1255) des CNRS in Paris.

Garzya published the journal Κοινωνία and the series Speculum (D’Auria, Naples) as well as  Hellenica et Bizantina Neapolitana (Bibliopolis, Naples) and Classici greci: Sezione tardoantica e bizantina (UTET, Turin).  He was a member of the publishing boards of  Revue des études grecques (Paris), of Cuadernos de filología clásica (Madrid), of Rivista di studi bizantini e neoellenici (Rome), of Bizantinistica (formerly Rivista di bizantinistica, Bologne), of Archivio di storia della cultura (Naples ) and of Magna Graecia (Cosenza).

Garzya's awards include an honorary doctorate from the University of Toulouse in 1967, membership in the Accademia Pontaniana in Naples in 1970 (then chairman of that institution in 2002 and then chairman emeritus) and, in 1981, membership of the  Accademia di Archeologia, Lettere e Belle Arti della Società Nazionale di Scienze Lettere e Arti in Naples and subsequent chairman of that institution from 1997 to 2000.  In 1974 he became a corresponding member in the Austrian Academy of Sciences, in 1980 an honorary member in the Εταιρεία Βυζαντινών Σπουδών (Athens), in 2001 an ordinary member of the Accademia delle Scienze (Turin), and in 2001 a member in the Academy of Athens. From 1980 he was vice-president of the International Association of Byzantine Studies and from 1993 honorary president of the Association of  Studies of Late Antiquity.
Garzya was married to Jacqueline Maguy Peeters (b. 1924 in Belgium - †2012 Naples). The couple had 2 children: Giacomo (b.1952) and Chiara (b.1955).

Research 
Garzya was primarily concerned with literary criticism of ancient Greek, of the Greek of Late Antiquity, and Byzantine Greek.  His focus in ancient literature was on archaic Choral poetry  (Alcman) and  Elegies (Theognis),  classical tragedies (Euripides) and their place in Ancient Greek Comedy (Menander) and in the Roman comedies of (Plautus). At the end of the 1950s Garzya turned his attention to the works of Late Antiquity (Synesius, Procopius of Gaza) and Byzantine literature (Nikephoros Basilakas, c. 1115– shortly after 1182; Theodoros Prodromos). He was also concerned with isolated texts such as a treatise by the otherwise unknown Dionysus of Philadelphia on bird catching and the Voskopula, an anonymous pastoral poem from the time of the Cretan Renaissance. In the 1990s he turned to the study of the medicine of ancient Greece and of Late Antiquity (Oribasius, Aëtius of Amida, Alexander of Tralles, Paul of Aegina, Cassius Iatrosofista) and of the Middle Ages. He placed critical editions on the works of many of these authors at the disposal of the Bibliotheca Teubneriana and Association Guillaume Budé.

Bibliography 
 Bibliografia di Antonio Garzya a cura di Alessia Guardasole, in: Synodia. Studia humanitatis Antonio Garzya septuagenario ab amicis atque discipulis dicata. M. D’Auria Editore, Neapel 1997, S. 1007–1033.

Monographs 
 Studi su Euripide e Menandro. G. Scalabrini, Neapel 1961. – Rez. von Hans Gärtner, in: Gnomon 34, 1962, S. 460–463, (online).
 Pensiero e tecnica drammatica in Euripide. Libreria Scientifica, Neapel 1962, zweite Auflage 1987.
 Studi sulla lirica greca da Alcmane al primo impero. Casa editrice G. D’Anna, 1963 (Biblioteca di cultura contemporanea, 83).
 Storia della letteratura greca. Paravia, Turin 1972, 17. Auflage 1991.
 mit Marcello Gigante, Giovanni Polara: Omaggio a B. G. Teubner. Un grande editore e gli studi classici. D'Auria, Neapel 1983 (Radici, 1).
 Medici bizantini (Oribasio, Aezio, Alessandro di Tralle, Paolo di Egina, Leone). Unione tipografico-editrice torinese, Turin 2006.

Literature 
 "Bibliografia di Antonio Garzya", ed. Alessia Guardasole, in: Synodia. Studia humanitatis Antonio Garzya septuagenario ab amicis atque discipulis dicata. M. D’Auria ed. Naples 1997, pp. 1007–1033.
 Ugo Criscuolo, Riccardo Maisano (Hrsg.): Synodia. Studia humanitatis Antonio Garzya septuagenario ab amicis atque discipulis dicata. M. D’Auria Editore, Naples, 1997.
 Riccardo Maisano: Antonio Garzya bizantinista. In: Ugo Criscuolo (publisher.), L’Antico e la sua eredità. Atti del Colloquio internazionale di studi in onore di Antonio Garzya (Naples, 20–21 September 2002). M. D’Auria, Naples 2004, S. 195–198, (online) (PDF).
 Literature by and about Antonio Garzya in the SUDOC-Catalog (Union of French University Librarians)
 Publications by Antonio Garzya in the RI-Opac of the Regesta Imperii
 Publications by Antonio Garzya in the OPAC of Monumenta Germaniae Historica

References 

1927 births
2012 deaths
People from Brindisi
Italian philologists
Italian classical scholars
University of Naples Federico II alumni